Carex catamarcensis is a tussock-forming perennial in the family Cyperaceae. It is native to south western parts of South America.

See also
 List of Carex species

References

catamarcensis
Plants described in 1899
Taxa named by Georg Kükenthal
Flora of Argentina
Flora of Chile